Live from London is a concert film by the British group, Duran Duran.  It was filmed during the course of the last two of five sold-out nights at Wembley Arena in April 2004, during the band's first global tour after the reunion of the band's original five members.

The concert features hits from their 25-year catalog, together with live versions of the singles from their 2004 studio album Astronaut.  The band was joined on stage by saxophonist Andy Hamilton and backing vocalist Sarah Brown.

Live from London is sold as a single-DVD set and also as a Deluxe DVD+CD box set, which features 20 songs on the DVD and 10 songs on the CD. Bonus features in the Deluxe set include a tour documentary, multi-angled viewing options, photo gallery, interviews, and behind the scenes footage. It was certified gold by the RIAA on 9 March 2006.

The concert was directed by Lawrence Jordan for Coming Home Studios, and filmed using twenty-eight cameras.  The DVD is presented in 16:9 widescreen format, and the audio options include SRS 5.1 Circle Surround Sound, and 5.1 DTS.

The package was Duran Duran's first DVD release since the 2003 music video compilation Greatest, and their first concert film since 1985's Arena.

Track listing

 "(Reach Up for The) Sunrise"
 "Hungry Like the Wolf"
 "Is There Something I Should Know?"
 "Union of the Snake"
 "Come Undone"
 "A View to a Kill"
 "What Happens Tomorrow"
 "The Chauffeur"
 "Planet Earth"
 "I Don't Want Your Love"
 "New Religion"
 "Ordinary World"
 "Night Boat"
 "Save a Prayer"
 "Notorious"
 "The Reflex"
 "Careless Memories"
 "The Wild Boys"
 "Girls on Film"
 "Rio"

Bonus CD with Deluxe Edition

 "(Reach Up For The) Sunrise"
 "Hungry Like The Wolf"
 "Planet Earth"
 "Ordinary World"
 "Save A Prayer"
 "Notorious"
 "Careless Memories"
 "The Wild Boys"
 "Girls On Film"
 "Rio"

Charts

Certifications

References 

Duran Duran video albums
Live video albums
2005 live albums
2005 video albums